Pro Lombardy Independence (Pro Lombardia Indipendenza) is an independentist party active in Lombardy, Italy.

The party, which was launched in 2011, is led by Alfredo Gatta; the spokesman is Alessandro Ceresoli.

The first objective of the party is the independence of the present-day Lombardy region, but it hopes for a unification of the 'Historical Lombardy', which in its eyes includes Emilia (part of the Emilia-Romagna region), the provinces of Novara and Verbano-Cusio-Ossola and the commune of Tortona (all three part of the Piedmont Region), and the 'Swiss Lombardia' (the Canton of Ticino and parts of the Canton of Graubünden).

According to its former president Giovanni Roversi, 'We don't want independence to build walls nor in opposition to other peoples: for us, a Sicilian is a European brother as is a citizen from Bavaria or from Galicia. We have an inclusive speech”.

The party was a member of the European Free Alliance.

Leadership
President: Alberto Reboldi (2011–2013), Giovanni Roversi (2013–2019), Alfredo Gatta (2019-present)
Spokesperson: Giacomo Consalez (2013–2015), Giovanni Roversi (2011–2013), Juri Orsi (2015–2019), Alessandro Ceresoli (2019–present)

References

External links

Political parties in Lombardy
Political parties established in 2011
Lombard nationalist parties
Separatism in Italy
Secessionist organizations in Europe
2011 establishments in Italy